William S. Herriman (24 October 1791 – 6 April 1867) was a wealthy businessman who became President of Long Island Bank, the first bank in Brooklyn, New York. He remained in that position until his death when he was replaced by William C. Fowler.

Family background
Herriman was born 1791 in Jamaica, Queens, New York, and was the third of four known surviving children. He had a brother and three sisters. His father was Stephen Herriman (formerly Harriman) III (1757-1792). His mother was Elizabeth Smith (1760-1847). William married Maria Belle Stillwell Frecke/Freeke on 13 December 1820.

Children
Herriman had five children. His second child, Caroline Herriman Polhemus (died 1906), the wife of Henry Ditmas Polhemus, founded the Polhemus Memorial Clinic, the first "skyscraper hospital", in honour of her late husband, who had served as the Regent of Long Island College Hospital (LICH) from 1872 until his death in 1895, and donated $400,000 to LICH for this work. She also founded the Herriman Home in Monsey, Rockland County.

His third child, William H. Herriman (1829-1918), became a noted art collector and gave a large number of paintings to the Brooklyn Museum on his death.

Death
William S. Herriman is buried in the Green-Wood Cemetery, Brooklyn, along with fifteen other people named Herriman between 1848 and 1939.

References

1791 births
1867 deaths
19th-century American businesspeople
People from Jamaica, Queens
American bank presidents
19th century in Brooklyn